The 1900 Kentucky Derby was the 26th running of the Kentucky Derby. The race took place on May 3, 1900. The winning time of 2:06.25 set a new Derby record.

Full results

Payout
 The winner received a purse of $4,850.
 Second place received $700.
 Third place received $300.

References

1900
Kentucky Derby
May 1900 sports events
Derby